Ti Point is an area off Omaha Beach in the small New Zealand village of Leigh, located in the Rodney District. Ti Point is situated very close to Leigh and Goat Island, and is just over one hour drive north of Auckland. It is used for fishing, boating, hiking, rock climbing and yachting, and is under governance of the Rodney District Council, just north of Whangateau.

When Europeans arrived in New Zealand, there were no Māori inhabitants of Ti Point, though there were thriving communities all around, in what would become Leigh and Omaha.  The remains of an ancient Pa (a fortified camp or village) can be seen just above the point itself.

The first European to settle Ti Point was William Arthur Torkington, a builder and carpenter from Manchester, England.  Several of William's descendants still live on Ti Point, and in the surrounding areas, and one of the few remaining buildings built by William, a church, can be seen in nearby Matakana, at the Matakana Country Park.

Geology

Ti Point is formed from the remnants of a Miocene era volcano, which erupted between 10 to 7 million years ago. Much of the peninsula is the eroded and exhumed volcanic plumbing that remains from the volcano.

Demographics
Ti Point is part of the larger Cape Rodney statistical area.

Ti Point had a population of 132 at the 2018 New Zealand census, an increase of 27 people (25.7%) since the 2013 census, and an increase of 48 people (57.1%) since the 2006 census. There were 45 households, comprising 72 males and 63 females, giving a sex ratio of 1.14 males per female. The median age was 46.0 years (compared with 37.4 years nationally), with 27 people (20.5%) aged under 15 years, 15 (11.4%) aged 15 to 29, 69 (52.3%) aged 30 to 64, and 24 (18.2%) aged 65 or older.

Ethnicities were 93.2% European/Pākehā, 6.8% Māori, 4.5% Pacific peoples, 2.3% Asian, and 4.5% other ethnicities. People may identify with more than one ethnicity.

Although some people chose not to answer the census's question about religious affiliation, 79.5% had no religion, 11.4% were Christian and 4.5% had other religions.

Of those at least 15 years old, 27 (25.7%) people had a bachelor's or higher degree, and 9 (8.6%) people had no formal qualifications. The median income was $29,200, compared with $31,800 nationally. 18 people (17.1%) earned over $70,000 compared to 17.2% nationally. The employment status of those at least 15 was that 42 (40.0%) people were employed full-time, 21 (20.0%) were part-time, and 3 (2.9%) were unemployed.

Wine-making
Since the late 1990s, wine has been produced at the Ti Point Winery, in the Matakana wine region. Their wines have won gold medals at several wine shows, including the Spiegelau International Wine Competition and the New Zealand International Wine Show.

Ti Point Reptile Park
Ti Point Reptile Park is the only zoo in New Zealand specialising in reptiles. Ivan Borich founded the park in 1972 and still privately owns and operates it as of September 2020.

The park contains a wide variety of reptiles, including tortoise, lizards, and Tuatara – a species of lizard only found in New Zealand.

Although the park specialises and contains predominantly reptiles, the park began as a traditional zoo, and still houses Capuchin monkeys and a Cockatoo.

References

Headlands of the Auckland Region
Matakana Coast